Papa Was a Preacher is a book written by Alyene Porter and published in 1944 by Abingdon Press. It was subsequently adapted into a stage play and a screenplay.

References

External links
 
 https://www.amazon.com/Papa-Was-Preacher-Alyene-Porter/dp/080078359X

1944 books
Books adapted into plays